Taliparamba taluk is one of the five taluks in Kannur district in the state of Kerala, India. It borders Payyanur Taluk in the north, Kannur taluk and Thalassery taluk in the south and Iritty taluk in the east. It is a revenue division for the ease of administrative purposes, and is headquartered in Taliparamba. Most government offices are in the Mini Civil Station in Taliparamba. Taliparamba taluk consists of Taliparamba Municipality, Anthoor Municipality, Sreekandapuram Municipality and 15 surrounding panchayats.

Constituent villages
Taliparamba taluk has 28 villages.
 Alakode, Anthoor, Cheleri, Chengalayi
 Chuzhali, Eruvessi, Irikkur, Kayaralam
 Kolachery, Kooveri, Kurumathur, Kuttiattoor
 Kuttiyeri, Malapattam, Maniyoor, Mayyil
 Morazha, Nediyanga, New Naduvil, Panniyoor
 Pariyaram, Pattuvam, Payyavoor, Sreekandapuram
 Taliparamba, Thimiri, Udayagiri and Vellad

Demographics

As of 2011 Census, Taliparamba taluk had a population of 764,888 where 365,811 are males and 399,077 are females. The average sex ratio was 1091. 36.3% of the population lives in urban areas and 63.7% in rural areas. 11% of the population in the taluk was under 6 years of age. The average literacy rate was 93.85%.

Geography
Taliparamba taluk consists of highland and midland regions including rubber, pepper, cashew and coconut plantations. It has predominantly agrarian economy.

References

Geography of Kannur district
Taluks of Kerala